"Staring at the Sun" is a song by Irish rock band U2. It is the fifth track on their 1997 album, Pop, and was released as its second single on 14 April 1997. It peaked at number three on the UK Singles Chart, number one in Canada and Iceland and number 26 on the US Billboard Hot 100. In the US, it topped the Billboard Modern Rock Tracks and Adult Alternative Songs charts. It also reached the top 10 in Finland, Ireland, Italy, New Zealand and Norway.

Background
The song was written with the line "Stuck together with God's glue," which was taken directly from the title of the album by the Irish band Something Happens, who are good friends with U2. The band felt the song was a potential "anthem to rival 'One'." A new mix of "Staring at the Sun" was released for the compilation, The Best of 1990-2000. During the summer of 2002 recording sessions in which "Electrical Storm" and "The Hands That Built America" were recorded, parts for four U2 songs were re-recorded, including "Staring at the Sun." The song has been compared to the work of Oasis.

A kaleidoscope bearing the single's logo in gold was distributed to promote the single.

Critical reception
British magazine Music Week rated the song five out of five, picking it as Single of the Week. They added, "Possibly the most obvious single on Pop, this track is awash with a melancholy that's amplified by The Edge's plangent, keening guitar signature. Big." David Sinclair from The Times wrote, ""God is good, but will He listen?" Bono asks in this solid return to traditional U2 territory. Does He have a choice?"

Live performances
"Staring at the Sun" was played at most of the PopMart Tour shows. However, during the first concert at Las Vegas, U2 failed to time the song correctly and had to start over. Bono singing at the wrong tempo was to blame for the mistake. The song was performed acoustically for most of the rest of that tour.  It had several appearances on the Elevation Tour, being the only Pop song to be performed on all three legs of the Elevation Tour. Sometimes it also appeared as a snippet in "Discothèque". It was performed as a live staple of the North American leg of the 2018 Experience + Innocence Tour."

It appeared in the live videos/recordings Please: PopHeart Live EP, "Please" single, PopMart: Live from Mexico City, Hasta la Vista Baby! and U2 Go Home: Live from Slane Castle, Ireland.

Formats and track listings

These remixes by Brothers in Rhythm originated as bootlegs on 12" vinyl. They use the live Rotterdam performance featured on the "Please" single rather than the album version. U2 approved it for limited promotional use to coincide with the release of The Best of 1990-2000.

Charts

Weekly charts

Year-end charts

Release history

See also
 List of covers of U2 songs – Staring at the Sun
 List of RPM number-one singles of 1997 (Canada)
 List of RPM Rock/Alternative number-one singles (Canada)
 Number one modern rock hits of 1997

References

1997 singles
U2 songs
RPM Top Singles number-one singles
Number-one singles in Iceland
Island Records singles
Songs written by Bono
Songs written by the Edge
Songs written by Adam Clayton
Songs written by Larry Mullen Jr.
Song recordings produced by Flood (producer)